Cloughfin is a townland lying within the civil parish of Kilcronaghan, County Londonderry, Northern Ireland. It lies in the center of the parish, and is bounded by the following townlands: Calmore, Coolsaragh, Killytoney, and Tullyroan. It was apportioned to the Drapers company and freeholds.

The townland was part of Tobermore electoral ward of the former Magherafelt District Council, however in 1901 and 1926 it was part of Iniscarn district electoral division as part of the Draperstown dispensary (registrar's) district of Magherafelt Rural District. It was also part of the historic barony of Loughinsholin.

History
Whilst Cloughfin is cited as meaning "white stone", it can not be ruled out that it may have a connection to the legendary figure, Finn McCool. There appears to be no trace left of the rock, which the townland is named after.

See also
Kilcronaghan
List of townlands in Tobermore
Tobermore

References

Townlands of County Londonderry
Civil parish of Kilcronaghan